Constitution Party, Constitutional Party, or Constitutionalist Party may refer to one of several political parties.

Active parties 
 Progressive Party (China) or Constitutionalist Party, a political party in the Republic of China
 Constitution Party (Egypt)
 Constitution Party (Estonia)
 National Constitution Party, a political party in Hungary
 Democratic Party (Indonesia), a political party now-represented in lower chamber
 Constitutionalist Party of Iran, a now-banned Iranian political party
 Constitutional Party (Spain)
 Constitution Party (United States)
 American Constitution Party (Colorado)
 Constitution Party of Oregon
 Constitutional Party (Uruguay)

Historical parties 
 Constitutional Party (Austria)
 Constitutional Party (Costa Rica)
 Constitution Party (United States, 1952), a former party in the United States
 Constitutional Party (Malta)
 Constitutional Party (Peru)
 Constitutionalist Party (South Africa), see 1910 South African Senate election

Alternate names 
 Kenseitō or Constitutional Party, a political party in Japan
 Kenseikai or Constitutional Association, a political party in Japan
 Junimea, a Romanian movement briefly active as the Constitutional Party

See also 
 Constitutional Bloc (disambiguation)
 Constitutional Democratic Party, a political party in the Russian Empire
 Constitutional Democratic Party (disambiguation)
 Constitutional Union Party (disambiguation)
 Constitutionalism, a political ideology marked by adherence to a constitution
 Constitutionalist Liberal Party, a political party in Nicaragua 
 Destour or the Constitutional Liberal Party, a political party in Tunisia
 Kensei Hontō or Constitutional Main Party, a political party in Japan
 New Constitution Party of Canada, an unregistered party in Canada
 Progressive Constitutionalist Party (Malta)
 Progressive Constitutionalist Party (Mexico)
 Rikken Dōshikai or Constitutional Association of Allies, a political party in Japan
 Rikken Kaishintō or Constitutional Reform Party, a political party in Japan
 Rikken Kokumintō or Constitutional Nationalist Party, a political party in Japan
 Rikken Minseitō or Constitutional Democratic Party, a political party in Japan
 Rikken Seiyūkai or Constitutional Association of Political Friendship, a political party in Japan
 Rikken Teiseitō or Constitutional Imperial Rule Party, a political party in Japan
 Zhi Xian Party (Constitution-Foremost Party of China), a political party in the People's Republic of China